The bare-tailed woolly opossum (Caluromys philander) is an opossum from South America. It was first described by Swedish zoologist Carl Linnaeus in 1758. The bare-tailed woolly opossum is characterized by a gray head, brown to gray coat, orange to gray underside and a partially naked tail. It is nocturnal (active mainly at night) and solitary; there is hardly any social interaction except between mother and juveniles and in mating pairs. The opossum constructs nests in tree cavities, and its litter size ranges from one to seven. Gestation lasts 25 days, and the juveniles exit the pouch after three months; weaning occurs a month later. The bare-tailed woolly opossum inhabits subtropical forests, rainforests, secondary forests, and plantations; its range extends from northern Venezuela to northeastern and southcentral Brazil. The IUCN classifies this opossum as least concern.

Names
It is called mucura-xixica in Portuguese, zarigüeya lanuda parda in Spanish, and wakaro in the Kwaza language of Rondônia, Brazil.

Taxonomy
The bare-tailed woolly opossum is one of the three members of Caluromys, and is placed in the family Didelphidae in the marsupial order Didelphimorphia. It was first described by Swedish zoologist Carl Linnaeus as Didelphis philander in the 10th edition of Systema Naturae (1758). It was given its present binomial name, Caluromys philander, by American zoologist Joel Asaph Allen in 1900. A 1955 revision of marsupial phylogeny grouped Caluromys, Caluromysiops, Dromiciops (monito del monte) and Glironia (bushy-tailed opossum) under a single subfamily, Microbiotheriinae, noting the dental similarities among these. A 1977 study argued that these similarities are the result of convergent evolution, and placed Caluromys, Caluromysiops and Glironia in a new subfamily, Caluromyinae. In another similar revision in 2009, the bushy-tailed opossum was placed in its own subfamily, Glironiinae.

The following four subspecies are recognized:

C. p. affinis Wagner, 1842: Occurs in Mato Grosso (Brazil) and Bolivia.
C. p. dichurus Wagner, 1842: Occurs in eastern and southeastern Brazil.
C. p. philander Linnaeus, 1758: Occurs to the east of Rio Negro in Brazil, the Guianas, and to the south of the Orinoco River in Venezuela.
C. p. trinitatis Thomas, 1894: Occurs in Trinidad and to the north of the Orinoco River in Venezuela.

The cladogram below, based on a 2016 study, shows the phylogenetic relationships of the bare-tailed woolly opossum.

Description
 

The bare-tailed woolly opossum is characterized by a brown to gray coat, gray head, orange to gray underside and a partially naked tail furry at the base. A distinctive, narrow dark brown stripe runs between the eyes and the ears, from the tip of the nose to the back of the ears. Similar but broad streaks run from brown rings around either eye. Grayish fur separates these stripes from one another. Ears are large and almost always hairless. The coat is thick, soft and woolly; the flanks may be grayer than the back. The dorsal hairs continue up to  onto the tail, after which it is naked, as the name suggests. The tail is dark brown towards the end, spotted with white and dark brown, terminating in a white or yellowish-white tip.

The ears measure , the tail  and the hind feet . The dental formula is  – typical of didelphids.

Ecology and behavior
The bare-tailed woolly opossum is nocturnal (active mainly at night), and thus difficult to observe or capture. Nevertheless, it is one of the very few opossums that have been successfully studied in detail. A study showed that activity of bare-tailed woolly opossums can be affected by the extent of moonlight. While activity in males dropped from new moon to full moon (that is, with increasing exposure to moonlight), activity in females remained largely unaffected. The opossum is arboreal (tree-living) and a good climber. A study showed that the tail, being prehensile, can act as an additional limb for locomotion, avoiding falls and carrying leaves to build nests. It builds nests with dry leaves in tree cavities.

Individuals tend to be aggressive to one another; hisses, grunts and even distress calls accompany agonistic behavior. Largely solitary, the only interactions observed are between mother and juveniles and in a mating pair. Ranges of both sexes overlapped extensively. The size of home ranges is influenced by environmental factors such as forage availability and individual needs. 'Click's are a common vocalization, produced by the young as well as adults. Bare-tailed woolly opossums, like other Caluromys species, will bite on being handled or to escape predators. Predators include the jaguarundi and margay. The Bare-tailed woolly opossum is a host of the Acanthocephalan intestinal parasite Gigantorhynchus lutzi.

Diet
An omnivore, the bare-tailed woolly opossum feeds on fruits, vegetables, gum, flowers, nectar, arthropods (such as beetles, butterflies and other insects), other small invertebrates, small birds and reptiles. A study of the foraging behavior of the bare-tailed woolly opossum and the sympatric kinkajou showed that both feed on a variety of plants, choose plants by their abundance, show similar preferences, and favor certain plant parts at certain times of the year. A notable difference between the two was that while the kinkajou focused on plants with a wide distribution, the bare-tailed woolly opossum also fed on less common plants.

Reproduction
In French Guiana, females mate successfully after they are a year old. Females can have three litters a year, unless food is scarce. Gestation lasts 25 days – the longest among didelphimorphs; the young come out of the pouch at three months and weaning occurs at four months. A study in French Guiana showed that development of the offspring is slow for the first 40 days, and then accelerates during the last 40 days. The litter size ranges from one to seven. Newborn weigh , and their weight increases to  after weaning. After exiting the pouch, offspring are sheltered in nests, where the mother regularly visits them for nursing.

Distribution and status
The bare-tailed woolly opossum inhabits subtropical forests, rainforests, secondary forests and plantations; it prefers dense cover, though it can be seen on canopies as well. The range extends from northern Venezuela eastward to northeastern and southcentral Brazil, and includes Guiana, French Guiana, Margarita Island, Trinidad, and Suriname. The IUCN classifies the bare-tailed woolly opossum as least concern, due to its wide distribution and presumed large population. The survival of this opossum is threatened by deforestation and habitat loss.

References

External links

Opossums
Marsupials of South America
Mammals of the Caribbean
Mammals of Bolivia
Mammals of Brazil
Mammals of French Guiana
Mammals of Guyana
Mammals of Suriname
Mammals of Trinidad and Tobago
Mammals of Venezuela
Fauna of the Amazon
Fauna of the Guianas
Mammals described in 1758
Taxa named by Carl Linnaeus